Louis Fishauf (born 1949) is a Canadian award-winning graphic designer, art director and illustrator known for creating logos, magazines, websites, packaging and brand identities for such companies as Sympatico, Adbeast, Alias, Roots, Molson Breweries, Intact Insurance and Toronto Life.

In 1991 Fishauf received the Les Usherwood award for lifetime achievement by the Advertising & Design Club of Canada.  He has also been the recipient of 6 gold awards from the National Magazine.

Notes

External links
 Reactor Art & Design represents Louis Fishauf as a commercial illustrator 
 Personal website

Living people
Canadian illustrators
1949 births
Canadian art directors
Canadian graphic designers
Logo designers